Cleese is a surname from Britain; an English surname, and a Scottish surname originating from MacCleese/McCleese.

People
People with this name include:
 Alyce Cleese (born 1944), U.S. psychotherapist
 Cynthia Cleese (born 1971), UK actress
 John Cleese (born 1939), UK comedian, member of Monty Python's Flying Circus, whose family name originated as "Cheese"

Other
Cleese may also refer to:
 Mount Cleese, the rubbish tip in Palmerston North, North Island, New Zealand

See also
 McCleese
 Leese (disambiguation)

Surnames of English origin